Jerlando F. L. Jackson is an American educator studying organizational science in higher education, with a special interest in hiring practices, career mobility, workforce diversity and workplace discrimination.

He is the Vilas Distinguished Professor of Higher Education at the University of Wisconsin–Madison and director and chief research scientist for Wisconsin’s Equity and Inclusion Laboratory (Wei LAB) in the Wisconsin Center for Education Research.

Early life and education
Jerlando F. L. Jackson was born in Ashburn, Georgia, but grew up in Fort Benning, Georgia, the son of a drill sergeant. He earned his bachelor's degree in music education from the University of Southern Mississippi, his master's degree in higher education administration from Auburn University and a Ph.D. in higher education from Iowa State University.

Career
In 2000, he began his career in the University of Wisconsin–Madison School of Education, becoming the first African American faculty member in the Department of Educational Leadership and Policy Analysis. He earned tenure in 2007, was promoted to full professor in 2011, and then rewarded with a named professorship from the Vilas Estate Trustees in 2012.

Career
Jackson conducts research on and evaluations of interventions designed to broaden participation for underrepresented group in STEM fields. In 2010, he founded the Wei LAB, a social science research laboratory investigating ways to promote equitable learning and work environments in education. Through the Wei LAB, Jackson is principal investigator for the National Study of Intercollegiate Athletics (NSIA), which studies hiring processes and workplace climate of collegiate athletic departments. The LAB is also assisting National Science Foundation-funded efforts such as the Institute for African American Mentoring in Computing Sciences (iAAMCS). In 2012, it founded the International Colloquium for Black Males in Education, a convening that gathers global experts at a different university or institute annually.

Selected bibliography 
Selected articles
Jackson, J. F. L., Charleston, L. J., & Gilbert, J. E. (2014) The Use Regional Data Collection to Inform University Led Initiatives: The Case of a STEM Education SWOT Analysis. Journal of STEM Education, 15(1), 11-19. 
Jackson, J. F. L., Charleston, L. J., Gilbert, J. E., & Seals, C. (2013). Changing Attitudes About Computing Science at Historically Black Colleges and Universities: Benefits of an Intervention Program Designed for Undergraduates. Journal of African American Studies, 17, 162-173. 
Jackson, J. F. L., & O’Callaghan, E. M. (2011) Understanding Employment Disparities Using Glass Ceiling Effects Criteria: An Examination of Race/Ethnicity and Senior-Level Position Attainment Across the Academic Workforce. Journal of the Professoriate, 5(2), 67-99.
Jackson, J. F. L., & O’Callaghan, E. M. (2009).What Do We Know About Glass Ceiling Effects? A Taxonomy and Critical Review to Inform Higher Education Research. Research in Higher Education, 50, 460-482.

Chapters in edited texts
Jackson, J. F. L., O’Callaghan, E. M., & Adserias, R. P. (2014). Approximating Glass Ceiling Effects Using Cross-Sectional Data. In J. F. L. Jackson, E. M. O’Callaghan, & R. A. Leon (Eds.), (2014). Measuring Glass Ceiling Effects in Higher Education: Opportunities and Challenges. New Directions for Institutional Research (159) (pp. 37–47).  Jossey-Bass Press.  
Jackson, J. F. L., Charleston, L. J., George, P. L., & Gilbert, J. E. (2012). Factors that Attract African American Males to Computer Science: A Study of Aspiring and Current Professionals. In M. C. Brown & T. E. Dancy (Eds.), African American Males and Education: Researching the Convergence of Race and Identity (pp. 189 – 201). Information Age.
Jackson, J. F. L., Charleston, L. J., Lewis, C. W., Gilbert, J. E., & Middleton, L. P. (2012). Rising STEM Occupational Demands and Low American American Participants in Arizona’s Scientific Workforce: Do Attitudes Toward STEM College Majors and Careers Matter? The State of Black Arizona: Volume III. Phoenix, AZ: Arizona State University. 
Jackson, J. F. L., & Charleston, L. J. (2012). Differential Gender Outcomes of Career Exploration Sessions for African American Undergraduates: An Examination of a Computing Science Outreach Effort at Predominantly White Institutions. In C. R. Chambers & R. V. Sharpe (Eds.), Black African Female Undergraduates on Campus: Success and Challenges (pp. 185–197). Emerald Group Publishing.

Books
Jackson, J. F. L. (Ed.). (2007). Strengthening the Educational Pipeline for African Americans: Informing Research, Policy, and Practice. SUNY Press.
Jackson, J. F. L., & Terrell, M. C. (Eds.) (2007). Creating and Maintaining Safe Campuses: A Sourcebook for Evaluating and Enhancing Safety Programs. Stylus Publishing. 
Jackson, J. F. L., & O’Callaghan, E. M. (2009). Ethnic and Racial Administrative Diversity: Understanding Work Life Realities and Experiences in Higher Education. Jossey-Bass Press. 
Harper, S. R., & Jackson, J. F. L. (Eds.). (2010). Introduction to American Higher Education. Routledge Press. 
Jackson, J. F. L., O’Callaghan, E. M., & Leon, R. A.  (Eds.). (2014). Measuring Glass Ceiling Effects in Higher Education: Opportunities and Challenges. New Directions for Institutional Research (159), Jossey-Bass Press.

References

External links
Wisconsin's Equity and Inclusion Laboratory (Wei LAB)
 https://scholar.google.com/citations?user=27AbTPYAAAAJ&hl=en&oi=ao

University of Wisconsin–Madison faculty
Living people
Iowa State University alumni
University of Southern Mississippi alumni
Year of birth missing (living people)
People from Turner County, Georgia